Gary Jones (born 1975) is a male retired boxer who competed for England.

Boxing career
Jones was a double English National Champion in 1994 and 1999 after winning the prestigious ABA light flyweight title, boxing out of the Sefton ABC and then Towerhill ABC.

He represented England in the light flyweight (-48 kg) division and won a bronze medal, at the 1998 Commonwealth Games in Kuala Lumpur, Malaysia.

He also won the Scottish ABA title and turned professional in 2003.

References

1975 births
English male boxers
Boxers at the 1998 Commonwealth Games
Living people
Commonwealth Games medallists in boxing
Commonwealth Games bronze medallists for England
Light-flyweight boxers
Medallists at the 1998 Commonwealth Games